Santiago! is a 1970 Philippine war drama and action film directed by Lino Brocka and starring Fernando Poe Jr. and Dante Rivero. Set during World War II, the film depicts a weary guerilla, Gonzalo, who withdraws from the battlefield. The film is the second directorial assignment of Brocka following his debut offering "Wanted: Perfect Mother". The film is also the first and only collaboration of Brocka and Poe, and features a rare scene featuring FPJ shedding a tear. The film is likewise notable for being the vehicle for Hilda Koronel's acting debut which also brought her her first acting award.

Plot
Set in the Philippines during the Japanese occupation, a Filipino soldier, who is guilt-ridden over an incident that killed many civilians, deserts the rebel army and retreats to a nearby barrio where he is branded as a coward.

Cast
 Fernando Poe Jr. as Gonzalo
 Dante Rivero as Celso
 Boots Anson-Roa as Lydia
 Hilda Koronel as Cristina
 Jay Ilagan as Danilo
 Caridad Sanchez as Pilar
 Mary Walter as Andang
 Ruben Rustia as Capt. Santos
 Joonee Gamboa as Desto
 Mario O'Hara as Diego
 Mildred Ortega as Celso's sister
 Cecilia Bulaong as Celso's sister
 Lily Gamboa as Celso's sister
 Corazon Noble as Celso's mother
 Marzya Ilagan as Daughter of Makapili
 Celeste Legaspi as Daughter of Makapili
 Lorli Villanueva as Villager
 Angie Ferro as Villager
 Silvestre Tecson as Villager
 Ursula Carlos as Villager
 Rosa Santos as Villager
 Inday de la Cruz as Villager
 Tina Lava as Villager
 Luis Benedicto as Celso's father
 Pons de Guzman as Makapili
 Fred Esplana as Japanese/Guerillas
 Burke Perdiz as Japanese/Guerillas
 Ely Perez as Japanese/Guerillas
 Roland Falcis as Japanese/Guerillas
 SOS Daredevils as Japanese/Guerillas

Awards and nominations

See also
 The Walls of Hell
 The Ravagers (film)
 Aguila (film)

References

External links 

Filipino-language films
1970 films
Historical action films
World War II films
Philippine historical films
Films directed by Lino Brocka